José Francisco Guerra Iglesias (born 22 June 1968) is a Spanish fencer. He competed in the foil events at the 1992 and 1996 Summer Olympics.

Notes

References

External links
 
 
 

1968 births
Living people
Spanish male foil fencers
Olympic fencers of Spain
Fencers at the 1992 Summer Olympics
Fencers at the 1996 Summer Olympics
Sportspeople from Burgos